Sousveillance is the recording of an activity by a member of the public, rather than a person or organisation in authority, typically by way of small wearable or portable personal technologies. The term, coined by Steve Mann, stems from the contrasting French words sur, meaning "above", and sous, meaning "below", i.e. "surveillance" denotes the "eye-in-the-sky" watching from above, whereas "sousveillance" denotes bring the means of observation down to human level, either physically (mounting cameras on people rather than on buildings) or hierarchically (ordinary people doing the watching, rather than higher authorities or architectures).

While surveillance and sousveillance both usually refer to visual monitoring, they can denote other forms of monitoring such as audio surveillance or sousveillance. With audio (e.g. recording of phone conversations), sousveillance is sometimes referred to as "one party consent".

Undersight (inverse oversight) is sousveillance at high-level, e.g. "citizen undersight" being reciprocal to a congressional oversight committee or the like.

Inverse surveillance is a subset of sousveillance with an emphasis on "watchful vigilance from underneath" and a form of surveillance inquiry or legal protection involving the recording, monitoring, study, or analysis of surveillance systems, proponents of surveillance, and possibly also recordings of authority figures. Inverse surveillance is typically undertaken by those who are subjected to surveillance, so it can be thought of as a form of ethnography or ethnomethodology (i.e. an analysis of the surveilled from the perspective of a participant in a society under surveillance). Sousveillance typically involves community-based recording from first person perspectives, without necessarily involving any specific political agenda, whereas inverse surveillance is a form of sousveillance that is typically directed at, or used to collect data to analyze or study, surveillance or its proponents (e.g., the actions of police or protestors at a protest rally).

Sousveillance is not necessarily countersurveillance. Sousveillance can be used to "counter" surveillance or it can be used with surveillance to create a more complete "veillance" ("Surveillance is a half-truth without sousveillance").  The question of "Who watches the watchers" is dealt with more properly under the topic of metaveillance (the veillance of veillance) than sousveillance.

Inverse surveillance 
Inverse surveillance is a type of sousveillance. The more general concept of sousveillance goes beyond just inverse surveillance and the associated twentieth-century political "us versus them" framework for citizens to photograph police,  shoppers to photograph shopkeepers, or passengers to photograph taxicab drivers. Howard Rheingold commented in his book Smart Mobs that this is similar to the pedestrian−driver concept, i.e. these are roles that many of us take both sides on, from time to time. Many aspects of sousveillance were examined in the general category of "reciprocal accountability" in David Brin's 1997 non-fiction book The Transparent Society, and also in Brin's novels. The first International Workshop on Inverse Surveillance, IWIS, took place in 2004, chaired by Dr. Jim Gemmell, (MyLifeBits), Joi Ito, Anastasios Venetsanopoulos, and Steve Mann, among others.

One of the things that brought inverse surveillance to light was the reactions of security guards to electric seeing aids and similar sousveillance practices.  It seemed, early on, that the more cameras that were in an establishment, the more the guards disliked the use of an electric seeing aid, such as the EyeTap eyeglasses.  It was through simply wearing electric seeing aids, as a passive observer, that it was discovered that surveillance and sousveillance can cause conflict and sometimes confrontation.  This led some researchers to explore why the perpetrators of surveillance are suspicious of sousveillance, and thus defined the notion of inverse surveillance as a new and interesting facet of studies in sousveillance.

Since the year 2001, December 24 has been World Sousveillance Day with groups of participants in New York City, Toronto, Boston, Florida, Vancouver, Japan, Spain and the United Kingdom.  However, this designated day focuses only on hierarchical sousveillance, whereas there are a number of groups around the world working on combining the two forms of sousveillance.

An essay from Wired magazine predicts that sousveillance is an important development that will be on the rise in 2014.

Sousveillance of a state by its citizens has been credited with addressing many problems such as election fraud or electoral misdeeds, as well as providing good governance. For example, mobile phones were used in Sierra Leone and Ghana in 2007 for checking malpractices and intimidation during elections.

A recent area of research further developed at IWIS was the equilibrium between surveillance and sousveillance. Current "equiveillance theory" holds that sousveillance, to some extent, often reduces or eliminates the need for surveillance.  In this sense it is possible to replace the Panoptic God's eye view of surveillance with a more community-building ubiquitous personal experience capture. Crimes, for example, might then be solved by way of collaboration among the citizenry rather than through the watching over the citizenry from above. But it is not so black-and-white as this dichotomy suggests.  In particular, citizens watching over their neighbors is not necessarily "better" than the alternative: an increase in community self-reliance might be offset by an uncomfortable "nosy neighbor" effect. "Personal sousveillance" has been referred to as "coveillance" by Mann, Nolan and Wellman.

Copwatch is a network of American and Canadian volunteer organizations that "police the police." Copwatch groups usually engage in monitoring of the police, videotaping police activity, and educating the public about police misconduct. Fitwatch is a group that photograph Forward Intelligence Teams (police photographers) in the United Kingdom.

In 2008, Cambridge researchers (in the MESSAGE project) teamed with bicycle couriers to measure and transmit air pollution indicators as they travel the city.

In 2012 the Danish daily newspaper and online title Dagbladet Information crowdmapped the positions of surveillance cameras by encouraging readers to use a free Android and iOS app to photograph and geolocate CCTV cameras.

Personal sousveillance 

Personal sousveillance is the art, science, and technology of personal experience capture, processing, storage, retrieval, and transmission, such as lifelong audiovisual recording by way of cybernetic prosthetics, such as seeing-aids, visual memory aids, and the like. Even today's personal sousveillance technologies like camera phones and weblogs tend to build a sense of community, in contrast to surveillance that some have said is corrosive to community.

The legal, ethical, and policy issues surrounding personal sousveillance are largely yet to be explored, but there are close parallels to the social and legal norms surrounding recording of telephone conversations.  When one or more parties to the conversation record it, it is called "sousveillance", whereas when the conversation is recorded by a person who is not a party to the conversation (such as a prison guard violating a client-lawyer relationship), the recording is called "surveillance".

"Targeted sousveillance" refers to sousveillance of a specific individual by one or more other individuals. Usually, the targeted individual is a representative or proponent of surveillance, so targeted sousveillance is often inverse surveillance or hierarchical sousveillance. "Hierarchical sousveillance" refers, for example, to citizens photographing the police, shoppers photographing shopkeepers, or taxicab passengers photographing cab drivers. So, for example, targeting former White House security official Admiral John Poindexter with sousveillance follows this more political narrative.

Classy's Kitchen describes sousveillance as "another way to add further introspection to the commons that keeps society open but still makes the world smaller and safer". In this way sousveillance may be regarded as a possible replacement for surveillance. In this sur/sousveillance replacement, one can consider an operative social norm that would require cameras to be attached to a human operator. Under such a scenario, any objections to the camera could be raised by another human more easily than it would be to interact with a lamp post upon which is mounted a surveillance camera. Thus, the argument is that cameras attached to people ought to be less offensive than cameras attached to inanimate objects, because there is at least one responsible party present to operate the camera. This responsible-party argument is analogous to that used for the operation of a motor vehicle, where a responsible driver is present, in contrast to the remote or automated operation of a motor vehicle.

Beyond the political or breaching of hierarchical structure explored in academia, the more rapidly emerging discourse on sousveillance within the industry is "personal sousveillance", namely the recording of an activity by a participant in the activity.

As the technologies get smaller and easier to use, the capture, recording, and playback of everyday life get that much easier to initiate spontaneously in unexpected situations. For example, David Ollila, a manufacturer of video camera equipment, was trapped for four hours aboard a Comair plane at JFK Airport in New York City. When he recorded an interview with the pilot about the situation, the pilot called the police who then removed Ollila for questioning and removed everyone from the plane.

Recording a situation is only part of the sousveillance process. Communicating is also important. Video-sharing sites such as YouTube and photo-sharing sites such as Flickr play a vital role. For example, police agents provocateur were quickly revealed on YouTube when they infiltrated a demonstration in Montebello, Quebec, against the leaders of Canada, Mexico and the United States (August 2007). When the head of the Quebec police publicly stated that there was no police presence, a sousveillance video showed him to be wrong. When he revised his statement to say that the police provocateurs were peaceful observers, the same video showed them to be masked, wearing police boots, and in one case holding a rock.

There are many similar examples, such as the widely viewed YouTube video of UCLA campus policemen tasering a student. In Russia, as well as in some other countries where road users trust neither each other nor police, onboard cameras are so ubiquitous that thousands of videos of automobile accidents and near-miss incidents have been uploaded. The unanticipated 2013 Russian meteor event was well documented from a dozen angles via the use of these devices. Similarly, in February 2015, dashcams caught valuable footage of the crash of TransAsia Airways Flight GE235.

Alibi sousveillance

Alibi sousveillance is a form of sousveillance activity aimed at generating an alibi as evidence to defend against allegations of wrongdoing.

Hasan Elahi, a University of Maryland professor, has produced a sousveillance for his entire life, after being detained at an airport because he was erroneously placed on the US terrorist watchlist. Some of his sousveillance activities include using his cell phone as a tracking device, and publicly posting debit card and other transactions that document his actions.

One specific use of alibi sousveillance is the growing trend of police officers wearing body cameras while on patrol. Well-publicized events involving police-citizen altercations (such as the case of Michael Brown in Ferguson, Missouri) have increased calls for police to wear body cameras and so capture evidence of the incidents, for their benefit and  the criminal justice system as a whole. By having officers use sousveillance, police forces can generate hours of video evidence to be used in cases like that of Michael Brown, and the video evidence can act as an important alibi in the judicial proceedings in regards to who is truly at fault. Regardless of the outcome of such events, contemporaneous audio-video evidence can be extremely valuable in respect of compliance- and enforcement-related events.

Police use
Use of wearable cameras by police officers combined with video streaming and recording in an archive produces a record of the interactions of the officer with civilians and criminals. Experiments with police use in Rialto, California from 2012 to 2013 resulted in a reduction of both complaints against officers and a reduction in the use of violence by officers. The public is shielded from police misconduct and the police officer from bogus complaints.

Because these body cameras are turned on for every encounter with the public, privacy issues have been brought up with specific emphasis on special victim cases such as rape or domestic violence.  Police worry that with a camera right in front of the victim, they will not feel comfortable revealing all the information that they know.  There have been two case studies done in the United States that have revealed that police officers who have cameras have fewer encounters with citizens than officers who do not have cameras, due to fear of being reprimanded for committing a mistake.

Sousveillance cultures 
Prior to contemporary sousveillance cultures, Simone Browne (2015) used "dark sousveillance" to refer to the ways that enslaved Black Americans refashioned techniques and technologies to facilitate survival and escape. Browne (2015) notes how pranks and other performative practices and creative acts were used to resist enslavement from experiential insight.

In the era of web-based participatory media and convergence cultures, non-governmental and non-state actors, with their own virtual communities and networks that cut across national borders, use what Bakir (2010) calls the sousveillant assemblage to wield discursive power. The sousveillant assemblage comprises Haggerty & Ericson's (2000) surveillant assemblage (or loosely linked, unstable, systems of data flows of people's activities, tracked by computers, and data-mined so that we are each reconfigured as (security) risks or (commercial) opportunities, but data-fattened by the proliferation of web-based participatory media and personal sousveillance that we willingly provide online). Verde Garrido (2015) has also explored Mann's concept of sousveillance and reinterpreted Michel Foucault's notion of parrhesia (i.e., confronting authority and power with the truth) to explain that in contemporary societies, which are global and digital, 'parrhesiastic sousveillance' allows to resist and contest social, economic, and political relations of power by means of technology. These acts of resistance and contestation, in turn, enable civil societies to change old meanings and offer new ones, using a newborn digital agency to create new and contemporary politics of truth.

Features of sousveillance cultures:
 Dissent, and holding power-holders to account, is easier 
Undoubtedly, the urge and practice of dissent have been common, and people exploit the participatory media technologies at hand to mark and spread their dissent. However, the rise of web-based participatory media and sousveillance cultures have made it easier for many more to record and spread this dissent globally, unimpeded by traditional media's commercial distribution restrictions such as pre-defined circulation runs or paid-for airtime, or the need for expert knowledge in media production. Mann has long maintained that the 'informal nature of sousveillance, with its tendency to distribute recordings widely, will often expose inappropriate use to scrutiny, whereas the secret nature of surveillance will tend to prevent misuse from coming to light' (Mann, 2005, p. 641). Just as Foucault's Panopticon operates through potential or implied surveillance, sousveillance might also operate through the credible threat of its existence. As the ubiquity and awareness of sousveillance widen, it is this that may most empower citizens – by making officials realise that their actions may, themselves, be monitored and exposed at any time. The permanent potential for sousveillance from so many (as opposed to more formalised exposés at the hands of investigative reporters, a small media elite) raises the likelihood that power abuses will be captured on record which can then be used to hold power-abusers and manipulators to account, providing of course, that there is a functioning legal system and/or public sphere (with mechanisms in place to translate popular demands and moral outrage into real-world change). 
 Emancipation, resistance and social change are unpredictable.
In the case of police body camera implementation in the US, there are multiple responses and social implications to this form of sousveillance. The case against police brutality and the Black Lives Matter movement has garnered an immense and impassioned following in a very short amount of time. There are two different social movements that have arisen in response to police body cameras. One school of thought that has manifested support is that police body cameras are necessary in fighting and ending police brutality. The other is the opposing stance to this one that raises the issue of privacy that police body cameras may violate. There have not been many case studies that have taken place in implementing police body cameras. This means that police worn body cameras have not been proven as a definite method to solve the problem of police brutality.  Studies have also shown that people, both policemen and civilians, act differently when they are aware that they are being surveilled on camera.  This leaves a lot of room for unpredictability surrounding the consequences of the use of this form of sousveillance.

In Mann's original conception, sousveillance had an emancipatory political thrust, with hierarchical sousveillance a conscious act of resistance to surveillance. Yet, the nature of the social change generated is unpredictable and dependent on the sousveillant content, the context of its subsequent sharing, and, of course, the strength of the traditions of deliberation for democratic purposes. ISIS' use of sousveillance, then, may result in social change, but not in a progressive fashion.
 Sousveillers' anonymity is crucial.
Given the lack of secrecy inherent in placing sousveillant content online, the anonymity of the sousveillers is of prime importance if hierarchical (politically or legally motivated) sousveillance is to proliferate. There is a real need for spaces online that are willing to protect users' anonymity and keep their subversive content online despite political or corporate pressure. With this sort of situation in mind, whistle-blowing websites have been set up that guarantee anonymity, such as Wiki-leaks, launched in December 2006. More such sites are needed.
 Agenda-building power comes from the searchable and recirculated, semi-permanent, eyewitness archive.
Social media provide what could be described as a semi-permanent, and easily accessible database of eyewitness accounts. Given that the web can be used and searched in the manner of a database to find examples of sousveillance; and given the recirculation of sousveillant footage in memes and in mainstream media, ever-hungry for new content in a media environment of convergence and expanding capacity, the longevity of sousveillant footage is perhaps what gives sousveillance its agenda-building power. It allows journalists, citizens, activists, insurgents, strategic communicators and researchers the opportunity to discover and partially relive both the eye-witnessed, sousveillant account, and the discourse surrounding specific moments of sousveillance, as well as reflecting on, and marshalling, their significance.

In art 

Referred to as an early proponent of lifelogging and perhaps the most extreme example of self-tracking since 2003, conceptual media artist Alberto Frigo has embarked on an ambitious project, 2004–2040, to understand himself. Starting with tracking everything his right (dominant) hand has used, he's slowly added on different tracking and documentation projects. Keeping the focus on himself and his surrounding has helped him connect to himself and the world around him.

Artist, scientist, and inventor S. Mann also created a wearable interactive art piece, the HeartCam, July 2001 in order to reverse the male gaze.  Others, including Nestle, have built upon this concept of reversing the "male gaze" by using a bra as a point-of-view for a camera.

Invisibility/Aposematic Suit

Invisibility/Aposematic Suit, S. Mann, 2001, is a wearable art piece that has two modes of operation: it either (1) becomes "transparent", suggestive of a chameleon's invisibility cloak (to hide from predators).  In this mode of operation the video displays show what is behind the wearer as if we can see through the wearer from both front and back; or
(2) reflective like a mirror, thus aposematic, to deter predators (i.e., to let them know they're being watched by the many hidden wearable cameras).  In this mode, the wearer becomes like a two-sided video mirror.  A potential attacker, whether approaching the wearer from the front or sneaking up behind the wearer, sees themselves displayed on the aposematic suit, in a manner similar to the way that department stores often place large video displays of their surveillance camera feed at the entrance to let potential shoplifters know they are being watched.

Other similar projects include the work of Shinseungback Kimyonghun: "[the] Aposematic Jacket is a wearable computer for self-defense. The lenses on the jacket give off the warning signal, " ... I can record you"..., to prevent possible attack. When the wearer pushes a button under threat, the jacket records the scene in 360 degrees and sends the images to the Web."

In fiction 
David Brin's 1989 novel Earth portrays citizens equipped with both augmented reality gear ("Tru-Vu Goggles") and cameras exercising reciprocal accountability, with each other and with authority figures, discussing effects on crime and presaging today's "cop cam" developments. Elites are allowed only temporary, cached secrecy. In Robert Sawyer's Neanderthal Parallax trilogy, the Homo neanderthalensis occupying a parallel universe have what are called companion implants. These are comprehensive recording and transmission devices, mounted in the forearm of each person. Their entire life is constantly monitored and sent to their alibi archive, a repository of recordings that are only accessible by their owner, or by the proper authorities when investigating an infraction, and in the latter case only in circumstances relevant to the investigation. Recordings are maintained after death; it is not made clear what the reasoning is for this and under what circumstances and or by whom a deceased person's archive can be accessed.

The plot of the 1995 movie Strange Days is based on a future where sousveillance recordings are made and sold as entertainment. The plot of the movie revolves around the murder of a celebrity by police officers that is recorded by a person secretly wearing one of the devices. In the movie, the recordings are made by a flat array of sensors that pick up signals from the brain stem. The sensors are usually hidden under a wig, and they record everything the person wearing them sees and hears. Recordings made while the person making them dies are called "blackjack" tapes.

The plot of the 1985 John Crowley short story Snow revolves around a suspended camera recording the whole of a subject's life being sold as a consumer product.

The 2007 novel Halting State by Charles Stross and its sequel Rule 34 depict a 2020s Scotland in which wearable computing has a level of ubiquity similar to that of 2013's cell phones. The implications of a society in which anyone might be recording anything at any time are explored at length, particularly with respect to policing.

The open source science fiction role-playing game Eclipse Phase has sousveillance as a common part of life in the setting, as a result of data storage technology and high-definition digital cameras becoming commonplace and often integrated into any and all objects.

Orson Scott Card's novel, the Worthing Chronicle also investigates the effect of (apparently) omnipotent watchers, and how it can degrade human experience—the moral dilemma leading the watchers to cease. Vernor Vinge's character, Pham Nuwen presciently recognizes the stage of "ubiquitous surveillance" in the collapse-and-rebuild cycle that plagues human planetary civilization in a Deepness in the Sky.

Sousveillance efficiency or efficacy 
There is a need for efficacy, efficiency or effectiveness of sousveillance, which can be met by social media, such as through widespread dissemination on social media, and when used as an output modality in conjunction with sousveillance as an input modality, is called "swollag", or gallows spelled backwards. For example, filming or streaming an abusive situation, like police abuse, doesn't always lead to justice and punishment of the abuser without some means (i.e. swollag) for sousveillance to take effect.  For example, in 2014, a man named Eric Garner was choked to death by a police officer in Staten Island after being arrested on suspicion of selling loose cigarettes.  "Garner's death was documented by his friend Ramsey Orta, and the video was widely disseminated. Despite the video evidence, a grand jury declined to indict Garner's killer, leading to widespread outrage and protest. (In an ironic twist, the only person indicted in connection with Garner's death was Orta, who came under police scrutiny and was arrested on an "unrelated" weapons possession charge. Orta is now in prison in New York. Sousveillance is not without its costs.)"

However, it appeared that a filmed abusive behavior is more likely to be punished if the video is widely spread. This makes sousveillance more efficient and politically meaningful, insofar it shows to a significant proportion of the population the abuses of the authority. Thus, the development of video platforms, like YouTube and Snapchat, and streaming platforms like Periscope and Twitch, are key components to sousveillance's efficiency. This was shown during French demonstrations against the "Loi Travail" in 2016, during which a Periscope stream showing authority forces, called abusive by one part of the demonstrators, was watched by 93,362 people. This video was posted on Twitter. Nevertheless, it can be considered whether this creates a dangerous dependence on private platforms, often ruled by Internet giants (like Google, for YouTube) which have common interests with governments, and who adapt their content through algorithms users don't have control on.

In addition, some argue that sousveillance may aid in state surveillance, despite being conducted by the people. Examples include mobile apps used to help people signal public threats, such as the Israeli app c-Now (previously known as Reporty). In January 2018, c-Now was tested in Nice by the mayor Christian Estrosi, sparking virulent public debates, with security advocates reporting spyware associated with the app Furthermore, the director of c-Now is Ehud Barack, former prime minister of Israel, who is suspected to have kept close links with Israeli and American governments. For these reasons, security advocates consider the app to serve America's global surveillance program (revealed by Edward Snowden in 2013), and raise the question of whether sousveillance really serves as "inverse surveillance".

See also 
 Body camera
 Eyetap
 Helmet camera
 Lifelogging
 Memoto
 Quantified self
 Quis custodiet ipsos custodes?
 Surveillance capitalism

References 

Surveillance
Technology in society
Civil disobedience
Culture jamming techniques